"The Crepes of Wrath" is the eleventh episode of the American animated television series The Simpsons. It originally aired on the Fox network in the United States on April 15, 1990. It was written by George Meyer, Sam Simon, John Swartzwelder and Jon Vitti, and directed by Wes Archer and Milton Gray.

Bart is sent to France on a student exchange trip, where his hosts treat him like a slave. Meanwhile, an Albanian student takes Bart's place in the Simpson family, and shows great interest in Homer's work at the nuclear power plant.

The episode received generally positive reviews from critics. In 1997, David Bauder from TV Guide named it the greatest episode of The Simpsons, and the 17th-greatest episode of any television series.

Plot
After Homer trips over Bart's skateboard and falls down the stairs, he is confined to the couch for several days with an injured back. As punishment, Marge makes Bart clean his room, where he discovers an old cherry bomb. At school the next day, he flushes it down a toilet in the boys' restroom while Principal Skinner's mother, Agnes, is using the adjacent girls' restroom. The resulting explosion blows her off the toilet seat and enrages Principal Skinner.

Skinner proposes to Homer and Marge that Bart be deported by enrolling him in the school foreign exchange program. When Bart sees a picture of a lovely French château, he agrees to go there, much to Homer and Skinner's delight. The Simpsons host a student from Albania named Adil Hoxha.

When Bart arrives at Château Maison, he finds a dilapidated farmhouse at a run-down vineyard. His hosts are winemakers César and Ugolin, who treat him like a slave. Bart is starved while being made to carry buckets of water, pick and crush grapes, sleep on the floor, and test wine contaminated with antifreeze.

Adil arrives in Springfield and impresses Marge and Homer with his polite manners and help with household chores. They are unaware that Adil is actually an Albanian spy sent to obtain blueprints of the Springfield Nuclear Power Plant's reactor. Homer unwittingly takes him on a tour of the plant and thinks nothing when Adil takes many photographs, which he transmits to Albania with a fax machine hidden in Bart's treehouse.

When Bart's captors send him to town to buy a case of antifreeze, he asks a gendarme for help, but the man does not speak a word of English. Bart walks away, and suddenly begins speaking French. Realizing that he is now fluent, he tells the gendarme about the cruelty that he has suffered at the hands of the winemakers, and about their efforts to sell adulterated wine. The men are swiftly arrested and Bart is hailed as a hero for exposing their scheme to sell adulterated wine.

In Springfield, Adil is caught spying by the FBI and deported to Albania in exchange for the return of an American spy captured there. Bart returns home with gifts for his family.

Production
"The Crepes of Wrath" was the first episode of The Simpsons for which George Meyer was credited as a writer, and he wrote it together with Sam Simon, John Swartzwelder and Jon Vitti. The episode was inspired by the French movie Manon of the Spring. The writers were trying to figure out which country the foreign exchange student should come from when they decided on Albania. They had not seen many uses of the country on television and decided to make the episode a tribute to actor John Belushi, who has Albanian roots. The writers did not know much about the country and could not think of a good name for the boy, so they gave him the surname Hoxha after the former leader of Albania, Enver Hoxha. They used real Albanian in the scene where Adil says goodbye to his family, and they tried to get the actual language right at Sam Simon's instigation. They also used real French in the scenes of Bart in France. The writers did some research on a certain airport in France for the shots of Bart at the airport in Paris. Principal Skinner's mother, Agnes Skinner, made her first appearance on The Simpsons in this episode, although her voice and personality were a bit different from what the viewers became used to in the later episodes of the show.

César and Ugolin are named after the peasants from the 1986 French language films Jean de Florette and Manon des Sources. Bart's French gift to Maggie is a reference to Le Ballon Rouge, a short French children's film. On the way to the chateau, Bart and Ugolin cycle past scenes depicted in several famous paintings, notably Bassin aux nymphéas by Claude Monet, Champ de blé aux corbeaux by Vincent van Gogh, Le rêve by Henri Rousseau and Déjeuner sur l'herbe by Édouard Manet.

A similar scandal involving the use of anti-freeze in wine emerged from Austria and West Germany in 1985.

Reception
In its original American broadcast, "The Crepes of Wrath" finished 29th for the week with a Nielsen rating of 15.9, the second highest rated show on Fox. "The Crepes of Wrath" received generally positive reviews from critics. Warren Martyn and Adrian Wood, the authors of the book I Can't Believe It's a Bigger and Better Updated Unofficial Simpsons Guide, said the episode was a "Tour de Force" and that this was "perhaps the first episode to make the viewer's jaw drop at the audacity and invention of the series' makers".

Colin Jacobson at DVD Movie Guide said in a review that "it's clear that the writers had started to find their groove by the time this episode was produced. From start to finish, 'Crepes' offered a solid experience, as the show began to feature more style and subtlety." Scott Collura at Hollywood Video praised the episode in a review, saying "it is one of the best of the first season." 

In 1997, David Bauder from TV Guide named this episode the greatest episode of The Simpsons, and the 17th greatest episode of any television show of all time. In 2006, IGN listed "The Crepes of Wrath" as the best episode of the first season, saying it "features a strong central storyline, with Bart being shipped off to France as an exchange student and being forced to work for two unscrupulous winemakers [who] mix antifreeze in their wine". The episode's reference to Le Ballon Rouge was named the third greatest film reference in the history of the show by Nathan Ditum of Total Film.

In Planet Simpson, author Chris Turner notes that many of the episode's French characters and settings are derived largely from American stereotypes of France, writing "[Caeser and Ugolin] are perfect embodiments of the stereotypical Frenchman so loathed in the United States."

References

Bibliography

External links

 
 

The Simpsons (season 1) episodes
1990 American television episodes
Television episodes set in Paris
Television shows written by John Swartzwelder
Student exchange in fiction